Mrosko is a surname. Notable people with the surname include:

Bob Mrosko (born 1965), American football player
Karl-Heinz Mrosko (1946-2019), German footballer